"Lo Mein" is a song by American rapper Lil Uzi Vert. It was released on March 6, 2020, as the second track off of their album Eternal Atake. The track peaked at number eight on the Billboard Hot 100.

Background 
The track was reportedly recorded in the middle of a Nerf gun fight. The track interpolates Future's track "The Percocet & Stripper Joint".

Critical reception 
Dylan Green of DJBooth had a mixed reaction to the song, saying that although the track had a "seamless transition", he called the "Asian-sounding synths" closing out the song "lame", and said a few of the lines "had NAV energy".

Commercial performance 
The track debuted at number eight on the Billboard Hot 100, making it the third highest-charting song from the album (behind "Baby Pluto" and "Futsal Shuffle 2020").

Charts

Certifications

References 

Songs written by Lil Uzi Vert
2020 songs
Lil Uzi Vert songs